This is a list of Canadian nurses who died during World War I. Canadian nurses were given the nickname "Bluebirds," because of their blue dresses and white veils. Out of the over three thousand Canadian nurses who volunteered their services 53 nurses died while serving their country. The military history of Canadian nurses during World War I began on August 4, 1914, when the United Kingdom entered the First World War (1914–1918) by declaring war on Germany. The British declaration of war automatically brought Canada into the war, because of Canada's legal status as a British Dominion which left foreign policy decisions in the hands of the British parliament.

When Canada entered the war there were five Permanent Force nurses and 57 listed in reserve. By 1917 the Canadian Army Nursing Service included 2,030 nurses, of which 1,886 were overseas, with 203 on reserve. By the end of the war, 3,141 had enlisted. The First World War had Casualty Clearing Station, an advance unit, that was close to the front line. Being near the front these stations were often bombed or hit by artillery. In one such incident in May 1918 a number of nurses were killed when the building they were tending wounded was bombed by Imperial German Aircraft. In another incident, on June 27, 1918, 14 nurses were killed when their hospital ship Hospital Ship HMHS Llandovery Castle was torpedoed while travelling from Halifax, Nova Scotia, to Liverpool, England.

War wasn't the only threat to nurses as at least six died in late 1918 of "pneumonia," probably related to the Spanish flu which raged throughout the world during the winter of 1918/1919.

List of Canadian nurses who died during WWI

Other Allied nations
Out of the 3,141 nurses who served during World War I, 53 died. Below are other nations and their nurse casualties.

See also
List of nurses who died in World War I

Bibliography 
Notes

References 

 - Total pages: 328 

Nurses
Killed